Charles-Eugène Delaunay (9 April 1816 – 5 August 1872) was a French astronomer and mathematician. His lunar motion studies were important in advancing both the theory of planetary motion and mathematics.

Life
Born in Lusigny-sur-Barse, France, to Jacques‐Hubert Delaunay and Catherine Choiselat, Delaunay studied under Jean-Baptiste Biot at the Sorbonne. He worked on the mechanics of the Moon as a special case of the three-body problem. He published two volumes on the topic, each of 900 pages in length, in 1860 and 1867. The work hints at chaos in the system, and clearly demonstrates the problem of so-called "small denominators" in perturbation theory.  His infinite series expression for finding the position of the Moon converged too slowly to be of practical use but was a catalyst in the development of functional analysis and computer algebra.

Delaunay became director of the Paris Observatory in 1870 but drowned in a boating accident near Cherbourg, France, two years later. He was followed by Jean Claude Bouquet at the Academy. Peter Guthrie Tait in his book An Elementary Treatise on Quaternions edition 1867 on page 244 named Didonia in honour of Delaunay.

Honours
Member of the Académie des Sciences, (1855)
Gold Medal of the Royal Astronomical Society, (1870)
His name is one of the 72 names inscribed on the Eiffel Tower.

References

Bibliography

By Delaunay

About Delaunay
[Anon.] (2001) "Delaunay, Charles-Eugène", ''Encyclopædia Britannica, Deluxe edition CD-ROM

Some of Delaunay's works are digitalized on Paris Observatory digital library.

École Polytechnique alumni
Mines Paris - PSL alumni
Corps des mines
19th-century French astronomers
19th-century French mathematicians
Recipients of the Gold Medal of the Royal Astronomical Society
1816 births
1872 deaths
Foreign Members of the Royal Society
Members of the French Academy of Sciences
Boating accident deaths
Accidental deaths in France